Støvkornenes dans i solstrålerne (Dust Motes Dancing in Sunbeams), also Solstråler (Sunbeams), is an oil painting from 1900 by the Danish Symbolist painter Vilhelm Hammershøi. Considered to be one of the masterpieces of Danish culture, it was included in the 2006 Danish Culture Canon.

Title
When he exhibited the painting, Hammershøi called it Solskin (sunshine) or Solstråler (sunbeams). It was only later it was given the more poetic title of Støvkornenes dans i solstrålerne. It is displayed in the Ordrupgaard Museum.

Description

The painting (oil on canvas, 70 x 59 cm) presents an empty room in Hammershøi's 17th century apartment in the Christianshavn district of Copenhagen. The bare panelled walls, without any furnishings or decorations, are illuminated by rays of winter sunlight shining through the window, a pattern of light and shade falling on the wooden floor.

The central feature of the work is the recessed window, through which shafts of dust-filled light shine diagonally down into the greyness of the room. The lack of colour is typical of Hammershøi. The overall impression is that the painting portrays a dark, silent psychological space although in fact the room was located in a busy part of the city, close to the noise of docks and factories.

Like many of his contemporaries, Hammershøi used photography as a basis for his works. This is also the case here. Indeed, the painting conveys the impression of a black and white photograph with all the intermediate greys while the dusty rays of sunlight give the room a highly poetic look. As in the paintings of the Romantic period, the window can be seen as a symbol of longing and dreaming, connecting the room's interior with the world outside, juxtaposing near and far.

References

Paintings by Vilhelm Hammershøi
Danish Culture Canon
1900 paintings
Paintings in the collection of the Ordrupgaard